{{Infobox CBB Team
|current = 2022–23 UMass Lowell River Hawks men's basketball team
|name = UMass Lowell River Hawks
|logo = UMass Lowell Athletics wordmark.png
|logo_size = 250
|university = University of Massachusetts Lowell
|conference = America East
|division = NCAA Division I
|city = Lowell, Massachusetts
|coach = Pat Duquette
|tenure = 9th
|arena = Tsongas Center at UMass Lowell Costello Athletic Center
|capacity =  Tsongas Center 7,649; Costello Athletic Center 2,100
|nickname = River Hawks
|h_body=
|h_pattern_b=
|h_shorts=
|h_pattern_s=
|a_body=
|a_pattern_b=
|a_shorts=
|a_pattern_s=
|NCAAchampion = 1988*
|NCAAfinalfour = 1988*
|NCAAeliteeight = 1988*, 2003*, 2004*
|NCAAsweetsixteen = 1988*, 2003*, 2004*, 2006*
|NCAAsecondround = 2001*, 2002*, 2003*, 2004*, 2006*
|NCAAtourneys = 1988*, 2001*, 2002*, 2003*, 2004*, 2006*, 2009*, 2010*, 2011*, 2012**at Division II level 
|conference_tournament = Northeast 10: 2003, 2004, 2010
| conference_season =NECC1988

Northeast-102003, 2004
}}

The UMass Lowell River Hawks men's basketball''' team represents the University of Massachusetts Lowell in Lowell, Massachusetts, United States. Beginning in the 2013–14 season, the River Hawks made the jump to NCAA Division I and joined the America East Conference. As part of their transition from Division II to Division I, they were not eligible for postseason play until the 2017–2018 season. The team is coached by Pat Duquette, who is in his tenth season. The River Hawks currently play most of their home games at the Costello Athletic Center but some games will be played at Tsongas Center. In 1988, UMass Lowell (then known as the University of Lowell) was the NCAA Division II national champions.

Postseason

NCAA Division II Tournament results
The River Hawks have appeared in the NCAA Division II Tournament ten times, making that tournament's Elite Eight three times. Their combined record is 15–9. They were Division II national champions in 1988.

Notable athletes and coaches
 Leo Parent, two-time All-American
 Elad Inbar, 2004 Division II Player of the Year

Season-by-season record
{| class="wikitable"

|- align="center"

References

External links
 Official Website